Byron Milton Tunnell (October 14, 1925 – March 7, 2000) was a state representative from 1957 to 1965, Speaker of the Texas House of Representatives from 1963 to 1965, and a member of the Texas Railroad Commission from 1965 to 1973.

Biography

Early life
Tunnell was born in Tyler, the county seat of Smith County and the largest city in east Texas, and educated in public schools. He graduated from Tyler High School and Tyler Junior College, then joined the United States Navy Air Corps during World War II as a tail gunner. On January 13, 1945, he married Bette Lemons (1927–1988).

In 1952, Tunnell received his law degree from Baylor Law School in Waco and returned to Tyler to become an assistant district attorney before entering private practice. He was joined by future Comptroller and Lieutenant Governor Bob Bullock in 1959, and the two formed a close bond.

Speaker of the Texas House
Tunnell was first elected to the Texas House in 1956. In the two years that he served as Speaker, which coincided with the first two years of the administration of Governor John B. Connally, Jr., the legislature created the Texas Parks and Wildlife Department, the state's first tourism department, and transferred what would become Padre Island National Seashore to the national government. On November 22, 1963, Tunnell was present at the Fort Worth breakfast at the Hotel Texas held for U.S. President John F. Kennedy shortly before his assassination later in the day. Others at the gathering included Texas Attorney General Waggoner Carr.

Railroad Commissioner
In 1965, Governor Connally appointed Tunnell to the Texas Railroad Commission upon the retirement of 32-year veteran Ernest O. Thompson. Ben Barnes was then elected Speaker. Tunnell was twice elected to the Railroad Commission—1966 and 1972—before he resigned in 1973 to become a vice president and lobbyist for Houston-based Tenneco, a petroleum and natural gas company. One of his lobbyist colleagues was former state Representative Phil Cates, formerly of Wheeler County. Tunnell's service as Railroad Commissioner overlapped with the energy crisis of the early 1970s.

Later career
In 1995, Governor George W. Bush appointed Tunnell to the State Conservatorship Board to overhaul and reorganize the troubled Texas Commission on Alcohol and Drug Abuse.

Death
Tunnell died of cancer in Lake Palestine on March 7, 2000. He and his wife are interred at the Texas State Cemetery in Austin.

References

1925 births
2000 deaths
Speakers of the Texas House of Representatives
Democratic Party members of the Texas House of Representatives
Members of the Railroad Commission of Texas
Texas lawyers
American lobbyists
United States Navy sailors
United States Navy personnel of World War II
Baylor Law School alumni
People from Tyler, Texas
People from Austin, Texas
Burials at Texas State Cemetery
20th-century American lawyers
20th-century American politicians
Deaths from cancer in Texas